"Voices" is a song by American metalcore band Motionless in White. Written by vocalist Chris "Motionless" Cerulli, Joshua Landry, Johnny Andrews, Drew Fulk, and Josh Strock, it was produced by Drew Fulk and Cerulli himself and featured on the band's 2017 fourth studio album Graveyard Shift. The song was also released as the sixth and final single from the album on May 23, 2018.

Composition and lyrics
"Voices" was written by Chris "Motionless" Cerulli, Drew Fulk, Johnny Andrews, Joshua Landry and Josh Strock and composed by the band. The song talks about everything that goes on in your head like the voices you hear and the demons you fight.

Music video
The music video for "Voices" was released on the same day as the single was streamed. Directed by Jeremy Danger and Travis Shinn, the video shows the band members wrestling with their multiple personalities.

Personnel
Credits retrieved from AllMusic.

Motionless in White
 Chris "Motionless" Cerulli – lead vocals
 Ryan Sitkowski – lead guitar
 Ricky "Horror" Olson – rhythm guitar, backing vocals
 Devin "Ghost" Sola – bass, backing vocals
 Josh Balz – keyboards, backing vocals

Additional musicians
 Tom Hane – drums

Charts

In popular culture
 The song featured in the promo of Aleister Black vs. Johnny Gargano for NXT TakeOver: WarGames (2018) as a theme song for the event.
 It was also used by WWE in Randy Orton's 20th Anniversary Celebration video package on WWE Raw in April 25, 2022.

References

2018 singles
2018 songs
Motionless in White songs
Roadrunner Records singles